Daviesia elliptica, commonly known as wild hops, is a species of flowering plant in the family Fabaceae and is endemic to eastern Australia. It is an open, usually multi-stemmed shrub with scattered, narrowly elliptic to egg-shaped phyllodes, and yellow and red to maroon flowers.

Description

Taxonomy and naming
Daviesia elliptica was first formally described in 1991 by Michael Crisp in Australian Systematic Botany from specimens collected near Tenterfield in 1984. The specific epithet (elliptica) means "elliptic".

Distribution and habitat
Wild hops grows in the understorey of forest on sandy soils derived from granite from Dalveen in south-eastern Queensland to Guyra on the Northern Tablelands of New South Wales.

Conservation status
Daviesia elliptica is listed as of "least concern" under the Queensland Government Nature Conservation Act 1992.

References

elliptica
Flora of Queensland
Flora of New South Wales
Plants described in 1991
Taxa named by Michael Crisp